The Love Boat is an American romantic comedy/drama television series that aired on ABC from 1977 to 1986; in addition, four three-hour specials aired in 1986, 1987, and 1990. The series was set on the luxury passenger cruise ship MS Pacific Princess, and revolved around the ship's captain Merrill Stubing (played by Gavin MacLeod) and a handful of his crew, with passengers played by guest actors for each episode, having romantic and humorous adventures. The ship's regular ports of call were Puerto Vallarta, Acapulco and Mazatlán. The series was part of ABC's popular Saturday-night lineup of the time, which also included Fantasy Island until 1984.

The original 1976 made-for-TV movie on which the show was based (also titled The Love Boat was itself based on the nonfiction book The Love Boats by Jeraldine Saunders, a real-life cruise director for a passenger cruise-ship line. Saunders was also partly inspired by the German cruise ship MV Aurora. The TV movie was followed by two more (titled The Love Boat II and The New Love Boat, all of which aired before the series began in September 1977.

The executive producer for the series was Aaron Spelling, who produced several television series for Four Star Television and ABC from the 1960s into the 1990s.

In 1987, the episode with segment titles "Hidden Treasure", "Picture from the Past", and "Ace's Salary" (Season 9, Episode 3) was ranked No. 82 on TV Guide's 100 Greatest Episodes of All Time list. Another made-for-TV movie, titled The Love Boat: A Valentine Voyage, starring four of the original cast members, aired in February 1990.

Cast

 Gavin MacLeod as Your Captain, Merrill Stubing
 Bernie Kopell as Your Ship's Doctor, Adam "Doc" Bricker; Kopell played a different character, Dr. O'Neill, in the second pilot film, Love Boat II.
 Fred Grandy as Your Yeoman Purser, Burl "Gopher" Smith (seasons 1–6), chief purser (seasons 7–9)
 Ted Lange as Your Bartender, Isaac Washington (seasons 1–9, four specials), yeoman purser (made-for-TV movie)
 Lauren Tewes as Your Cruise Director, Julie McCoy (seasons 1–7, four specials, plus a guest appearance in season 9)
 Jill Whelan as Vicki Stubing, the captain's daughter (guest appearance in season 2, seasons 3–9, four specials, made-for-TV movie)
 Ted McGinley as Your Ship's Photographer, Ashley "Ace" Covington Evans (seasons 7–9), yeoman purser (four specials)
 Patricia Klous as Judy McCoy, Julie's sister and successor as cruise director (seasons 8–9)

MacLeod, Kopell and Lange are the only cast members to appear in every episode of the TV series as well as the last three made-for-TV movies. Grandy appeared in every episode throughout the run of the series but did not appear in the last of the TV movies, as he was campaigning for the first of his four consecutive terms in the U.S. House of Representatives. MacLeod was not the captain of the Pacific Princess in the first two TV movies and did not appear in them, although when his character was introduced, it was mentioned that he was the new captain; indeed, none of the series cast members appeared in the first pilot, which had a different captain and crew.

Among the series' attractions was the casting of well-known actors in guest-starring roles, with many famous film stars of prior decades making rare television appearances. The Love Boat was not the first comedy series to use the guest-star cast anthology format—Love, American Style had used the formula seven years earlier—but it had such success with the formula that future series in similar style (such as Supertrain and Masquerade) drew comparisons to The Love Boat. The series was followed on Saturday nights on ABC by Fantasy Island, which was also produced by Aaron Spelling and had a similar format. In all, 32 past and future Academy Award winners guested on The Love Boat, including the Best Actress from the first Oscar ceremony in 1929, Janet Gaynor.

In the final season, a troupe of dancers who performed choreographed performances was introduced. The Love Boat Mermaids were made up of Tori Brenno (Maria), Debra Johnson (Patti), Deborah Bartlett (Susie), Macarena (Sheila), Beth Myatt (Mary Beth), Andrea Moen (Starlight), Teri Hatcher (Amy) and Nanci Lynn Hammond (Jane).

Episodes

Production

The one-hour sitcom was set aboard Pacific Princess, at the time a real-life Princess Cruises cruise ship. The Pacific Princess twin sister vessel Island Princess was also used for the show, especially if the show's schedule conflicted with Pacific Princesss cruises or her dry dock.

In 1981, P&O Cruises' line Sea Princess (now ) was also used for the special two-hour episode "Julie's Wedding", set in and around Australia.

The series was filmed primarily on sets in southern California: 20th Century Fox Studios for seasons one through five, and the Warner Hollywood Studios for the remainder of the series. The "star of the show", the cruise ship itself, after being renamed  and being sold then owned by another cruise line in Spain, the now-world famous Pacific Princess was scrapped in Aliağa, Turkey in 2013 after no further buyer could be found. Her sister ship, which was later renamed , was scrapped in Alang, India in 2015 after she too failed to get a new owner. Both vessels' scrappings were controversial, but the previous owners justified it by saying that they were getting too old to continue operating.

Episodes set and filmed in other European and East Asian locations became more frequent instead of the usual west coasts along the Pacific shores of the Americas as the show continued. They traditionally aired as season premieres or during the sweeps months of February, May and November.

Writing format

Every episode contained several storylines, each written by a different set of writers working on one group of guest stars. Thus, episodes have multiple titles referencing its simultaneous storylines, e.g., the first episode of season one is "Captain & the Lady / Centerfold / One If by Land".

There were typically three storylines. One storyline usually focused on a member of the crew, a second storyline would often focus on a crew member interacting with a passenger, and the third storyline was more focused on a single passenger (or a group of passengers). The three storylines usually followed a similar thematic pattern: One storyline (typically the "crew" one) was straight-ahead comedy. The second would typically follow more of a romantic comedy format (with only occasional dramatic elements). The third storyline would usually be the most dramatic of the three, often offering few (if any) laughs and a far more serious tone.

Laugh track
The series was also distinctive as being one of the few hour-long series ever made for American television that used a laugh track.

Theme song and title sequence

The Love Boat theme song was sung by Jack Jones (except for the last season, where a cover version by Dionne Warwick was used). The lyrics were written by Paul Williams with music by Charles Fox. The song has since been recorded and released commercially, by Charo in 1978 and Amanda Lear in 2001.

The opening sequence for the series underwent three changes over the years. From seasons one to eight, the opening sequence began with a long shot of the ship before the camera slowly zoomed in onto its bridge area. This was followed by posing shots of the crew members (updated several times due to cast additions and changes throughout all seasons) at different points on the ship set. The long shot footage of the ship was used for the credits of the celebrity guest stars. For only the first season, the guest stars were credited by having their names appear on the screen while the series' logo, a radar/compass style circle with four hearts, wrapped around them. Beginning with season two (and originally experimented with in the fifteenth episode of the first season), the compass was graphically put in place and at its center, the guest stars were shown posing for the camera on different parts of the set (or a city spot used in on-location episodes) while their names appeared at the bottom of the screen. For the final season, the compass was replaced by a crescent wave and the long shots of the ship were replaced by a montage of the various locations traveled to on the series. At the center of the wave graphic, the guest stars were shown posing for the camera wearing their formal outfits against different colored backgrounds.  Following the guest stars, cast regulars were revealed with a weighing anchor graphic wipe.

Reception
For its first seven years, The Love Boat was very successful in the ratings. During that time, it usually ranked among the top 20, and sometimes even the top 10. However, the show fell out of the Top 30 during the 1984–85 season, and after falling out of the Top 50 during the 1985–86 season, The Love Boat was canceled after nine years on ABC, although four three-hour specials aired during the 1986–87 season. In 1980–81, The Love Boat aired in reruns on ABC daytime, and beat The Price Is Right in the ratings for a few months.

Nielsen Ratings
 1977–78: #16 - 21.9
 1978–79: #17 - 22.1
 1979–80: #24 - 20.6
 1980–81: #5 - 24.3
 1981–82: #15 - 21.2
 1982–83: #9 - 20.3
 1983–84: #17 - 19.0
 1984–85: #34 - 15.3
 1985–86: #62 - 12.7

Syndication
The Love Boat entered the syndication market in the United States in September 1983, with Worldvision Enterprises handling distribution. As an alternative for stations with tight scheduling commitments, Worldvision offered edited 30-minute episodes in addition to the original hour-long programs beginning in the fall of 1986 after the series completed its original run on ABC. It is currently distributed in syndication by its successor CBS Media Ventures.

Sequels, spin-offs and crossovers
On rare occasions, there were crossovers between stories. In one episode, actors Robert Reed and Florence Henderson, formerly of The Brady Bunch, guest-starred in separate segments. In one scene, the two bump into each other in the hallway, exchange a questioning look, do a double-take and shrug and continue on their separate ways.

 The 1979 two-hour season premiere of Charlie's Angels—another Aaron Spelling series—that introduced Shelley Hack as new angel Tiffany Welles was titled "Love Boat Angels" and its characters attempted to recover stolen museum artifacts while aboard the Pacific Princess on a cruise to the Virgin Islands (all of the Love Boat regulars had cameo appearances).
 A Saturday Night Live sketch featuring guest host Patrick Stewart merged The Love Boat with Star Trek: The Next Generation. Stewart played the captain while caricatures of Deanna Troi and Geordi LaForge played the cruise director and bartender, which also had a cameo by Bernie Koppell as Doc.
 A two-part 1997 Martin episode, "Goin' Overboard", had the main characters going on a cruise and encountering Isaac, Julie, Doc, and Vicki.

Sequels
 A TV reunion movie, The Love Boat: A Valentine Voyage, aired on CBS in 1990.
 A revival of the series, titled Love Boat: The Next Wave, aired on UPN from 1998 to 1999, with Robert Urich as Captain Jim Kennedy, a retired United States Navy officer, Phil Morris as chief purser Will Sanders, and Heidi Mark as cruise director Nicole Jordan (several members of the original show's cast guest-starred on a reunion-themed episode in which it was revealed that Julie and Doc had been in love all along).

The Real Love Boat
In March 2022, both CBS and Australia's Network 10 (both Paramount-owned networks) commissioned The Real Love Boat, a reality dating competition series to be produced by Eureka Productions. The series will feature single contestants on a luxury Mediterranean cruise as they participate in challenges and dates to stay on the boat in the hopes of finding love, with those unsuccessful being progressively dumped from the cruise. As contestants are dumped, new contestants will come aboard the cruise. In the end, the last couple remaining will win the series and be awarded a large cash prize as well as a cruise from Princess Cruises. 

The American version is hosted by married actors Jerry O'Connell and Rebecca Romijn. The American version of the show briefly aired on Wednesday nights at 9/8C on CBS starting on October 5, 2022. 

The Australian version is presented by Darren McMullen. The Australian version also premiered on 5 October 2022 and aired on Wednesdays and Thursday nights on 10.

Home media
CBS DVD (distributed by Paramount) has released seasons 1–4 of The Love Boat on DVD in Region 1. Each season has been released in two-volume sets.

Awards and honors
In 2014, Fred Grandy, Bernie Kopell, Ted Lange, Gavin McLeod, Cynthia Lauren Tewes, and Jill Whelan became godparents (the passenger ship industry's equivalent of naval ship sponsors) of the Princess Cruises ship .

On May 23, 2017, the original cast (MacLeod, Kopell, Grandy, Lange, Tewes and Whelan) reunited on Today, where it was announced they would be receiving a joint star on the Hollywood Walk of Fame for their contributions to television, sponsored by Princess Cruises.

References

External links

 
 
 

1970s American anthology television series
1970s American comedy-drama television series
1970s American sitcoms
1970s romantic comedy television series
1970s romantic drama television series
1977 American television series debuts
1980s American anthology television series
1980s American comedy-drama television series
1980s American romantic comedy television series
1980s American sitcoms
1980s romantic drama television series
1987 American television series endings
American Broadcasting Company original programming
American romantic drama television series
English-language television shows
Fictional ships
Princess Cruises
Television series by CBS Studios
Television series by Spelling Television
Television shows based on books
Television shows set in Florida
Television shows set in Los Angeles
Television series set on cruise ships